The Shriners Children's Texas is a 30-bed non-profit pediatric burn hospital, research, and teaching center located on the campus of the University of Texas Medical Branch in Galveston, Texas, US.  Part of a 22-hospital system, it is one of the three Shriner's Hospitals that specialize exclusively in burn care and consists of an intensive care unit with 15 acute beds and a reconstruction and plastic surgery unit with 15 reconstruction beds along with three operating rooms and beds for orthopedic and spine care. The hospital is verified as a burn center by the American Burn Association and accredited by the Joint Commission on Accreditation of Healthcare Organizations.  In 2012, the hospital joined the Texas Medical Center as its 50th member institution.

History
In 1962 the Shriners of North America allocated $10 million to establish three hospitals that specialized in the treatment and rehabilitation of burned children.  After visiting 21 university-based medical institutions, the decision was made to build the first pediatric burn unit on the campus of the University of Texas Medical Branch at Galveston (UTMB).  In 1963 the "Shriners Burns Institute" began operation in a seven-bed ward in John Sealy Hospital, the teaching hospital for UTMB.  In the interim, a specialized Shriner's Burns Hospital was being constructed on land adjacent to the university, that had been donated by the Sealy & Smith Foundation. Work on the hospital was completed in 1966 and the institute moved in shortly after.

By the late 1980s the Shriners began to study the possibility of replacing the aging 1966 hospital.  Since their orthopedic children's hospital in nearby Houston was also slated to be replaced, the organization studied combining the two institutions and basing them in the Texas Medical Center.  However the Sealy & Smith Foundation and the Moody Foundation both offered substantial financial and logistical support to the organization if it would choose to stay in Galveston.  With Galveston foundations willing to cover much of the cost of a new hospital, the Shriners agreed to remain in the island city and renewed their agreement with UTMB.  In 1989 construction commenced on a new eight-story hospital tower that would be equipped with 30 beds, three operating rooms, a 163-seat auditorium, research & rehabilitation facilities and a skywalk directly linking the hospital with UTMB's John Sealy and Children's hospitals.  The new hospital was completed and occupied in 1992, followed by Sealy Smith Foundation purchasing the 1966 hospital and donating it to UTMB for use as a research facility.

Hurricane Ike
The hospital was damaged by Hurricane Ike in September 2008. In light of the cost of repairs and the economic downturn, the Shriner's National Hospital Board planned to mothball the facility in the aftermath of the storm, however the Shriners National Convention overturned the decision and voted to repair and reopen the Galveston facility.  Prior to the storm, the hospital serviced both burns patients and patients with cleft lip and palate disorders.  However, when the Galveston hospital reopened in 2009, the decision was made to relocate the cleft lip program to the hospital's sister institution, the Shriners Orthopaedic Hospital for Children in Houston.

Merger and Expansion
In January 2020 it was announced that Shriners Hospital for Children in Houston would be closing their facility and transferring staff and programs to their sister hospital, Shriners Hospital for Burned Children, in Galveston.  The merger was expected to be completed by the 4th Quarter of 2020 with the closing of the Houston Hospital occurring in early 2021. After the merger the Shriners Hospital for Burned Children -- Galveston would be renamed Shriners Children's Texas, to reflect the expanded programs and services.

See also

Shriners Hospitals for Children
List of Texas Medical Center institutions
List of hospitals in Texas

References

External links
Shriners Hospital for Children - Texas

Hospitals in Texas
Hospital buildings completed in 1966
Hospital buildings completed in 1992
Healthcare in Galveston, Texas
Buildings and structures in Galveston, Texas
University of Texas Medical Branch
Institutions in the Texas Medical Center
Texas
Children's hospitals in the United States
Children's hospitals in Texas